Mingary is a small rural locality in the Outback Communities Authority of South Australia, Australia.

References

Towns in South Australia
Far North (South Australia)
Places in the unincorporated areas of South Australia